Eggar may refer to:

 Lasiocampidae, the eggar moths

People
 Dave Eggar (born 1977) US musician
 John Eggar (1916-1983) UK cricketer
 Katharine Emily Eggar (1874-1961) UK musician
 Samantha Eggar (born 1931) British-American actress
 Tim Eggar (born 1951) UK politician

Other uses
 Eggar's School, secondary school in Alton, Hampshire, England, UK

See also
 Eggers (surname)
 Egger (surname)
 Egger (disambiguation)